Salvia sprucei is a herbaceous perennial in the family Lamiaceae that is native to Ecuador, growing at  elevation or higher in thick scrub on steep slopes. It was named in 1898 by botanist John Isaac Briquet for the British plant collector Richard Spruce. It is likely that Spruce discovered the plant on a collecting trip in Ecuador in 1857.

The top of the leaf is green with a yellow undertone, while the underside has white veining that is covered with hairs. The calyces are yellow-green and quite long, reaching . The loosely held whorls of flowers grow on branched inflorescences.

Notes

References
 

sprucei
Flora of Ecuador
Data deficient plants
Taxonomy articles created by Polbot
Plants described in 1898